Grant Gibbs is a former U.S. soccer defender who spent his professional career in clubs F.C. Portland, Seattle Storm and Miami Freedom.

Biography
Gibbs grew up in Federal Way, Washington, where he attended Thomas Jefferson High School. After graduating from high school in 1982, Gibbs attended Warner Pacific College. While in college, he played for F.C. Portland of the Western Soccer Alliance (WSA) from 1985 to 1987. In 1988, he moved to the Seattle Storm where he played until the end of the 1990 season. He was a first team All Star in 1988 and a second team All Star in 1989. In December 1989 and January 1990, he travelled to England where he trained with the lower division clubs Leyton Orient and AFC Bournemouth. When he was unable to secure a contract, he returned to Seattle for the 1990 season. The Storm folded at the end of the 1990 season and Gibbs then moved to the Miami Freedom of the American Professional Soccer League, which was formed by the merger of the WSA and American Soccer League.

External links
 Seattle Storm profile

1964 births
Living people
Western Soccer Alliance players
Seattle Storm (soccer) players
Portland Timbers (1985–1990) players
American Professional Soccer League players
Miami Freedom players
American soccer players
Warner Pacific Knights men's soccer players
People from Federal Way, Washington
Soccer players from Washington (state)
Association football defenders